Elk River is a city in the northwestern United States in Clearwater County, Idaho. The population was 125 at the 2010 census, down from 156 in 2000. It is accessed from State Highway 8 from Bovill, to the west in adjacent Latah County. Formerly the site of a Potlatch sawmill, it was phased out after several decades during the 1930s.

Geography

Climate
This region experiences warm (but not hot) and dry summers, with no average monthly temperatures above .  According to the Köppen Climate Classification system, Elk River has a dry-summer humid continental climate, abbreviated "Dsb" on climate maps.

Demographics

2010 census
As of the census of 2010, there were 125 people, 65 households, and 31 families residing in the city. The racial makeup of the city was 100.0% White. Hispanic or Latino of any race were 3.2% of the population.

There were 65 households, of which 9.2% had children under the age of 18 living with them, 46.2% were married couples living together, 1.5% had a female householder with no husband present, and 52.3% were non-families. 50.8% of all households were made up of individuals, and 20% had someone living alone who was 65 years of age or older. The average household size was 1.92 and the average family size was 2.90.

The median age in the city was 52.4 years. 12.8% of residents were under the age of 18; 2.4% were between the ages of 18 and 24; 19.2% were from 25 to 44; 44% were from 45 to 64; and 21.6% were 65 years of age or older. The gender makeup of the city was 52.8% male and 47.2% female.

2000 census
As of the 2000 census, there were 156 people, 75 households, and 54 families residing in the city. The racial makeup of the city was 95.51% White, 0.64% Asian, and 3.85% from two or more races. Hispanic or Latino of any race were 0.64% of the population. 

There were 75 households, out of which 13.3% had children under the age of 18 living with them, 66.7% were married couples living together, 2.7% had a female householder with no husband present, and 26.7% were non-families. 21.3% of all households were made up of individuals, and 8.0% had someone living alone who was 65 years of age or older. The average household size was 2.08 and the average family size was 2.38.

In the city, the population was spread out, with 13.5% under the age of 18, 1.9% from 18 to 24, 19.2% from 25 to 44, 41.0% from 45 to 64, and 24.4% who were 65 years of age or older. The median age was 53 years. For every 100 females, there were 116.7 males. For every 100 females age 18 and over, there were 107.7 males.

The median income for a household in the city was $30,000, and the median income for a family was $31,250. Males had a median income of $29,375 versus $17,500 for females. The per capita income for the city was $16,082. About 11.3% of families and 14.1% of the population were below the poverty line, including 27.8% of those under the age of eighteen and 8.9% of those 65 or over.

Education
The public school was closed  in 1990 and students attend classes in Bovill in Latah County.

In popular culture
In 2011 John Oliver and Andy Zaltzman of satirical podcast The Bugle claimed to be planning to declare war against the town. In December 2017 The Bugle recognised Elk River as the capital of the United States, following the Trump administration's announcement of plans to relocate the US embassy in Israel from Tel Aviv to Jerusalem.

References

External links

 Public Library
 Regional Information

Cities in Idaho
Cities in Clearwater County, Idaho